Atlantic is the first studio album by the South African mathcore band Theatre. The album was released on 10 December 2010.

Writing and recording
The album was written over a period of one year and recorded at Considerthis Studios in Somerset West over a period of two months. The record was later mastered and the casings were cut and screen-printed by hand by the band members themselves. Two-hundred copies were printed.

Release
The record was released on the weekend of 10 December 2010, where after the band embarked on a string of shows across the Western Cape, as well as touring up to Durban, Pietermaritzburg and Welkom for the launch. The record caused quite a bustle in and around the country and the track "First Flaws in the Master Plan" was featured on the MB Agency's compilation CD along with Facedown Record's Take It Back! and various other artists. It was also a featured track on the Thursday metal show on The Source FM radio station in the United States.

Track listing 
 "This Is Not A Rumour..." – 00:54
 "First Flaws in the Master Plan" – 03:15
 "Swords" – 03:27
 "The Seeing Room" – 04:16
 "Then Came Sailing" – 02:48
 "Interruption" – 01:06
 "Flood Came Tearing" – 05:02
 "Atlantic" – 03:27

Personnel 
Theatre
 JJ Van Rooyen – vocals
 Byron Jones – guitar
 Duke van Heerden – guitar, bass guitar
 Jay-Dee Bekker – bass guitar
 TJ – drums

Artwork
 Schalk Venter – layout & design
 TJ – digital content layout & design

References

Theatre (band) albums
2010 albums